The Higginsville Gold Mine is a gold mine located near Higginsville, 45 km north of Norseman, Western Australia.

The mine has been owned and operated by Karora Resources since 2019 and is one of two mines operated by the company in Western Australia, the other being the Beta Hunt Mine.

History

The Higginsville mine was in operation in the 1990s, its mill ceasing work in October 1997. Mining continued until early 2000, with ore being milled at the Chalice Gold Mine. The mine was then owned in parts by the St Ives Gold Mining Company, a subsidiary of Gold Fields, who had also purchased the nearby St Ives Gold Mine from WMC Resources in 2001.

Avoca Resources Limited, listed on the Australian Securities Exchange in 2002, paid A$6.25 million to Gold Fields for its Higginsville exploration project in June 2004. After discovering the Trident deposit in late 2004, Avoca raised $125 million in April 2007 to build a new mine at Higginsville. Also in 2007, Avoca purchased the neighbouring Chalice deposit from Chalice Gold Mines Limited. Gold production at the mine begun in 2008 from underground operations, with the first gold pour on 1 July 2008.

Avoca has made headlines in 2009 when it became engaged in a bitter dispute with Ramelius Resources over conflicting takeover bids for Dioro Exploration NL. Avoca eventually had to drop its bid for Dioro, having reached a 44.85% interest in Dioro at the close of the offer on 20 August, short of the 50% needed. Ramelius's offer for the company closes on 8 February 2010. Avoca made a renewed takeover offer for the company in late December 2009. Avoca eventually succeeded in its bid for Dioro and, on 21 April 2010, Dioro was delisted from the ASX.

Avoca, owner of the mine at the time, merged in with Anatolia Minerals Development Limited in 2011 to form Alacer Gold. Alacer Gold, in turn, sold its Australian operations, consisting of Higginsville and the South Kalgoorlie Gold Mine, to Metals X in September 2013 for A$40 million. Metals X took ownership of the mine on 1 October 2013 and operated it through its subsidiary Westgold Resources. In 2016, Metals X and Westgold de-merged, with the latter retaining ownership of the gold mining operations, including Higginsville.

In June 2019, the mine was acquired by Canadian company RNC Minerals from its previous owner, Westgold Resources for A$50 million, half of which was paid in cash and the remainder in shares. RNC Minerals, at the time, already owned the nearby Beta Hunt Mine. RNC Minerals changed its name to Karora Resources in June 2020.

Production
Recent annual production of the mine:

Further reading
 Higginsville Palaeochannel Gold Deposits, Kambalda, Western Australia

Sources
 Place Names Search Results - Higginsville Geoscience Australia website
 The Australian Mines Handbook: 2003-2004 Edition, Louthean Media Pty Ltd, Editor: Ross Louthean
 Western Australian Mineral and Petroleum Statistics Digest 2008 p. 34: Principal Mineral and Petroleum Producers - Gold

References

External links 
 
 MINEDEX website: Higginsville Database of the Department of Mines, Industry Regulation and Safety

Gold mines in Western Australia
Surface mines in Australia
Underground mines in Australia
Shire of Coolgardie